Pikkjärv ('long lake' as noun) or Pikkjärve ('long lake' as genitive) are Estonian-language toponyms:
Karula Pikkjärv, lake in Valga County
Kõnnu Pikkjärv, lake in Ida-Viru County
Viitna Pikkjärv, lake in Lääne-Viru County 

Pikkjärve, Jõgeva County, village in Palamuse Parish, Jõgeva County
Pikkjärve, Valga County, village in Karula Parish, Valga County